Douglas Ferguson may refer to:
Doug Ferguson (musician), British musician, bass guitarist in Camel
Doug Ferguson (politician), president of the Liberal Party of Canada, 2008–2009
Doug Ferguson (Fair City), a character in soap opera Fair City
Douglas Ferguson (artist) (born 1951), New York-based artist and fashion designer
Douglas Ferguson, American poet, member of M'bwebwe
Doug Ferguson, golf writer for the Associated Press
J. Douglas Ferguson, Canadian numismatist, ANA President 1941–43, whose collection is now in the Currency Museum
Duggie Ferguson, fictional character in the soap opera Coronation Street